Holly Gleason is an American music critic,  songwriter, and music industry consultant.   Focused primarily on country and roots music, she has written for Rolling Stone, the New York Times, and Spin, among others.  As a publicist,  Gleason has worked with artists including Kenny Chesney,  Brooks & Dunn, Emmylou Harris, John Prine, and Rodney Crowell.   Under the name Lady Goodman, she co-wrote "Better as a Memory," a #1 hit on the Billboard Hot Country charts for Chesney in 2008.

Early life and education
Gleason grew up in Shaker Heights, Ohio. She earned a BA in communications from the University of Miami and an MFA in writing from Spalding University.

Career

Music critic, publicist
While still in college, Gleason began her career as a music critic for the Miami Herald.  From 1990 through 1993, she worked as a publicist for Sony Music Nashville, and subsequently founded Joe's Garage, a Nashville-based public relations and artist development agency.   While the company was active (1993-2008), she additionally served as the features editor for Hits (1998-2000), and founded a blog, The Yummy List. 

Gleason has freelanced as a music critic and journalist since 1993. She was nominated for Best Cultural Reporting for her 2015 essay, “The Impossible Lightness of Being Taylor Swift,” by the International Network of Street Papers. In 2016, she was awarded a fellowship by the Rock and Roll Hall of Fame’s CWRU Center for Pop Music Studies.  

Gleason edited Woman Walk the Line:  How the Women in Country Music Changed Our Lives, a collection of essays by female music writers on the artists that inspired them. It was published in September 2017 by the University of Texas Press as part of their American Music Series.

Lady Goodman
Gleason writes songs under the pen name Lady Goodman, a character in the film Almost Famous.  She has collaborated with Guy Clark, Rodney Crowell, Bill Deasy, Matchbox 20's Kyle Cook, Restless Heart's Larry Stewart, Marc Lee Shannon and Andrea Zonn.  After working as Chesney's publicist, she co-wrote "Better as a Memory" with Travis Hill (credited as Scooter Carusoe).  Chesney recorded the song unaware that Gleason had written it, and included it on his 2007 album Just Who I Am: Poets and Pirates.

References

External links
 Official site
 The Yummy List

Year of birth missing (living people)
Living people
Rock critics
American country songwriters
People from Shaker Heights, Ohio
Spalding University alumni
University of Miami School of Communication alumni